Dansk Landbrugs Grovvareselskab, officially DLG, is a Danish co-operative company owned by Danish farmers. The main business areas are farm supplies, vitamins and minerals, service and energy. Activities comprise trade in seed grain, grain and other crops, animal nutrition, vitamins and minerals for animal feed and fuel for agriculture. DLG’s principal markets are Denmark, Germany and Sweden, but export across Europe, the Middle East, Africa and South America also constitutes a large part of the business. The export comprise malting barley, feed grain and bread grain, rapeseed and rapeseed oil.

The total annual export of crops reaches about DKK 5 billion. Furthermore, DLG runs the retail chain "Land & Fritid" selling products for house and garden. The DLG Group has 40 subsidiaries in 18 countries.

In 2014 the Group turnover reached more than DKK 49,1 billion (EUR 6,55 Billion or USD 8,21 Billion). The Group employs  6,300 people (as of 2018), 2,000 of which are working in Denmark. DLG’s full name is Dansk Landbrugs Grovvareselskab a.m.b.a. and the co-operative was formed in 1969 by the merger of Jysk Andels Foderstofforretning (JAF, established in 1898), Øernes Andelsselskab for Indkøb af Foderstoffer (ØA, established in 1901) and Dansk Andels-Gødningsforretning (DAG, established in 1901).

In 1994 DLG acquired Superfos Grovvarer, in 1999 Fyens Andels-Foderstofforretning (FAF), in 2002 parts of KFK, in 2003 Bornholms Andels Foderstofforretning (BAF), and 2010 parts of Aarhus Egnens Andel. In 2007 DLG acquired two new subsidiaries, Kongskilde Industries A/S and the German farm supply company HaGe. In 2013 the German Team AG also entered the group of DLG subsidiaries. The DLG headquarters in Copenhagen was sold in 2017 and DLG has its main office in Fredericia from 2020. In 2017, DLG sold Kongskilde Industries A/S to Green Park Partners (UK).

Group CEO is Kristian Hundebøll.

References

External links 

 

Cooperatives in Denmark
Wholesalers of Denmark
Agriculture companies of Denmark
Service companies based in Copenhagen
Danish companies established in 1969
Stock and station agencies
Agriculture companies established in 1969